Lorini-ye Ajudani (also Romanized as Lorīnī-ye Ājūdānī; also known as Lorīnī) is a village in Hasanabad Rural District, in the Central District of Eslamabad-e Gharb County, Kermanshah Province, Iran. At the 2006 census, its population was 330, in 70 families.

References 

Populated places in Eslamabad-e Gharb County